Arthur Hall may refer to:

 Arthur Hall (English politician) (1539–1605), English Member of Parliament
 Arthur R. Hall (1869–1955), head football coach at the University of Illinois, 1907–1912
 Arthur Hall (New Zealand politician) (1880–1931), New Zealand politician
 Arthur Hall (stationer), 19th-century British publisher and writer
 Arthur Hall (soldier) (1896–1978), Australian recipient of the Victoria Cross
 Arthur Henderson Hall (1906–1983), English painter, illustrator and glass designer
 Arthur Hall (footballer) (1918–2002), Australian rules footballer
 Arthur David Hall III (1925–2006), American electrical engineer
 Arthur L. Hall (1934–2000), African American dancer, choreographer
 Arthur C. A. Hall (1847–1930), bishop of Vermont in the Episcopal Church

See also
 Arthur Hull (disambiguation)